The N7 road is a national primary road in Ireland, connecting Limerick and Dublin. The majority of the route (between Naas and Limerick) is motorway standard and is designated as the M7 motorway. At the Rosbrien interchange in Limerick the route continues as the N18 dual carriageway to Shannon and Ennis. The road passes through the midlands of Ireland, and acts as a trunk route out of Dublin for the N8 and N9 national primary routes to Cork and Waterford respectively. It forms part of European route E20.

Route

N7 - Naas Road

From the M50, the N7 passes south of Clondalkin leaving the city as part of the Naas Road. (The Naas Road begins at the Grand Canal as a regional road (R810), a continuation of the Tyrconnell Road. It continues 3.4  km southwest to the M50 motorway, at the Red Cow interchange, where it becomes the N7.) Construction of the third lane commenced on 4 January 2005 and concluded on 14 August 2006 (thumbnail left); having been originally dualled between 1963 and 1968.

At Newlands Cross a flyover and exit slip roads replaced the at-grade signal-controlled crossing in November 2014. This eliminated the last signal-controlled crossing on the N7/M7 route between the M50 and Limerick. Traffic for Clondalkin to the north and Tallaght to the south leave the N7 by slip roads connecting to the R113. The N7 continues southwards to bypass Citywest, Saggart, Rathcoole, Kill and Johnstown in County Kildare. These locations are all served with grade-separated interchanges which were constructed as part of the upgrade works completed in the mid-2000s. The old junctions consisted of traffic lights with a break in the dual-carriageway median. The three-lane section used to end at junction 9 (Naas, Sallins) with a left-hand lane-drop/lane-gain for traffic leaving/entering here.

The section of the N7 between Naas and the M50 Motorway is the second busiest road in the country with frequent daily tailbacks from the Naas North junction on the southbound side.

This part of the route is the only section that remains designated as N7 as the road is not motorway standard. Left-in/left-out access is provided to minor roads and to homes, farms and businesses along this section.

M7 - Naas to Limerick

From Naas, motorway restrictions are enforced and the route is designated as the M7 motorway. The route continues in a south-west direction bypassing the towns of Naas, Newbridge, Kildare, Monasterevin and Portlaoise. The M9 to Waterford diverges from the route at junction 11. South of Portlaoise the M8 diverges from the M7 to Cork and the south at junction 19 with the M7 continuing south-westwards bypassing the towns of Mountrath, Borris-in-Ossory, Castletown (County Laois), Roscrea, Moneygall, Toomevara, Nenagh and Birdhill. From Birdhill the route continues towards Limerick city where it forms part of the Limerick Southern Ring Road bypassing Annacotty and Castletroy. The route terminates at the Rosbrien Interchange to the south of Limerick City. The road continues as the N18 into county Clare. At the Rosbrien Interchange, access is available to the M20 motorway via a slip road from the M7.

History
Originally the N7 was a single carriage-way route between Dublin and Limerick and passed through the main towns on the route that are now bypassed. The old N7 route was downgraded to regional road status (as soon as sections of the M7 motorway were complete) and is currently designated as the R445 road. The R445 is an alternative route between Limerick and Dublin.

Until 2012, the N7 was the only one of the inter-urban routes out of Dublin which did not commence in Dublin city centre, but rather at the M50. The original N7 route (under the Local Government (Roads and Motorways) Act, 1974 (Declaration of National Roads) Order, 1977) started the route in Dublin city centre, like the other national routes, with the route originally running through Inchicore village before reaching the Naas Road. However, in 1994, following the construction of the Chapelizod bypass which brought the N4 road (now R148) into Dublin city centre as dual carriageway, the N7 inside the M50 was downgraded to regional road status (as the R110 road), with N7 traffic signposted to use the N4 and M50 rather than the original route through Inchicore.

The N7 is noted for two firsts in the history of Irish roads - the first substantial length of dual carriageway in Ireland, running  from Dublin to Naas which was completed in 1968 and also Ireland's first section of motorway, the  Naas Bypass, opened in 1983 bypassing the original route through the town.

The old N7 route (now R445/R110) also formed most of the T5 trunk route between Dublin and Limerick. This was an old method of designating routes in Ireland before the current method was introduced.

History of upgrades to the N7 and M7
Towards the start of the 21st Century, a substantial effort was made to upgrade all sections of the N7 road to motorway standard, creating a high-quality standard connection between Dublin and Limerick. Prior to the year 2000, only short sections of the N7 were of motorway or dual-carriageway status:
 Widening of the N7 between Dublin and Naas to dual carriageway status - 1960s (the third lane constructed each way completed in 2006)
 M7 Naas Bypass - completed 1983
 M7 Newbridge Bypass - completed 1993
 M7 Portlaoise Bypass - completed 1997

As part of the National Development Plan undertaken by the Irish Government from the mid-2000s onwards; work took place to link existing sections of the M7 and extend it to Limerick:
 M7 Kildare Bypass - completed 2003
 M7 Monasterevin Bypass and Limerick Bypass - completed in 2004
 M7 Nenagh to Limerick, Portlaoise to Castletown and Castletown to Nenagh - all completed in 2010.

Map of route
 Route of N7 overlaid on Google Maps

Junctions

The junctions on the Naas Bypass and Newbridge Bypass sections of the M7 were previously numbered J7-J11 (now renumbered Junctions 9-13), in the expectation that an M7 motorway would be built along a new alignment. Instead, the Naas Road dual-carriageway was upgraded. There remain some private accesses and minor exits prior to J9, the beginning of the M7 motorway.

See also
 Roads in Ireland
 Motorways in Ireland
 National secondary road
 Regional road

References

07
Roads in County Dublin
Roads in County Kildare
Roads in County Laois
Roads in County Tipperary
Roads in County Offaly
Roads in County Limerick